
Gmina Rajcza is a rural gmina (administrative district) in Żywiec County, Silesian Voivodeship, in southern Poland, on the Slovak border.

Villages
Gmina Rajcza contains the villages and settlements of Rajcza, Rycerka Dolna, Rycerka Górna, Sól, Sól-Kiczora and Zwardoń.

Neighbouring gminas
Gmina Rajcza is bordered by the gminas of Istebna, Milówka and Ujsoły. It also borders Slovakia.

Twin towns – sister cities

Gmina Rajcza is twinned with:
 Košařiska, Czech Republic
 Łobez, Poland

References

Rajcza
Żywiec County